"Hearts Like Ours" is the first single from In Rolling Waves, the second studio album from New Zealand post-punk revival band The Naked and Famous. The song, which is also the sixth single from the ensemble, premiered 23 July 2013 on BBC Radio 1 as Zane Lowe’s “Hottest Record in the World Today”. The video was released on YouTube on 29 July 2013.

Composition and lyrics 
Ricardo Baca of The Denver Post stated that "this latest single has some of the same electronic pop manipulation that made “Young Blood” so fun".

Release and reception 
The song premiered 23 July 2013 on BBC Radio 1 as Zane Lowe’s “Hottest Record in the World Today”.  The video was released on YouTube on 29 July 2013.

Video 
The music video, directed by Campbell Hooper of Special Problems, was filmed in Los Angeles and New Zealand.

Personnel 
Credits adapted from the liner notes of In Rolling Waves.
Billy Bush – engineer
 John Catlin – engineer (mix)
 Joe LaPorta – mastered
 Justin Meldal-Johnsen – producer
 Alan Moulder – mixing
 Thom Powers – producer
 David Schwerkolt – engineer (assistant)

Charts

Release history

In popular culture 

It was used in the fourth episode of the fifth season of  The CW television series The Vampire Diaries. Hearts Like Ours appears on the soundtrack for EA Sports game, FIFA 14.
The song was also used in the season one finale of the MTV television series Happyland.

Hearts Like Ours was also appropriately used as the closing song to the 6-episode documentary series on the imperious New Zealand national rugby team, the All Blacks - All Or Nothing: New Zealand All Blacks.

References

External links 
 

2013 singles
The Naked and Famous songs
2013 songs